Puligny-Montrachet wine is produced in the commune of Puligny-Montrachet in Côte de Beaune of Burgundy. The Appellation d'origine contrôlée (AOC) Puligny-Montrachet may be used for white wine and red with respectively Chardonnay and Pinot noir as the main grape variety. However, almost only white Puligny-Montrachet is produced, at around 99.5 per cent of the total production. There are four Grand Cru vineyards within Puligny-Montrachet, with Montrachet the most well-known, and 17 Premier Cru vineyards.

Some  of this area was used for the red wines in 2007. The amount produced corresponds to slightly fewer than 1.5 million bottles of which slightly fewer than 7,000 bottles were red wine.

For white wines, the AOC regulations allow both Chardonnay and Pinot blanc to be used, but most wines are 100% Chardonnay. The AOC regulations also allow up to 15 per cent total of Chardonnay, Pinot blanc and Pinot gris as accessory grapes in the rare red wines, but this not very often practiced. The allowed base yield is 45 hectoliters per hectare for white wine (40 for red wine). The grapes must reach a maturity of at least 11.0 per cent potential alcohol for village-level white wine (10.5 for red) and 11.5 per cent for Premier Cru white wine (11.0 for red).

The style of white Puligny-Montrachet is often very mineral, with a more restrained oak character compared to the white wines of some of the other Côte de Beaune villages, and tends to be described as "elegant" rather than fruit-driven, although some aspects of the style (such as the level of fruitiness) varies somewhat between producers and specific vineyards.

Grands Crus

There are four Grand Cru vineyards located in the southern part of Puligny-Montrachet, bordering on Chassagne-Montrachet. Bienvenues-Bâtard-Montrachet, and Chevalier-Montrachet, are located entirely within Puligny-Montrachet.

Premiers Crus
There are 19 climats in Puligny-Montrachet classified as Premier Cru vineyards, located both to the south of the village, in the Chassagne-Montrachet direction, and to the north, in the Meursault direction. Their wines are designated Puligny-Montrachet Premier Cru + vineyard name, such as Puligny-Montrachet Premier Cru Les Folatières, or may be labelled just Puligny-Montrachet Premier Cru, in which case it is possible to blend wine from several Premier Cru vineyards within the AOC.

In 2007,  of the total Puligny-Montrachet vineyard surface consisted of Premier Cru vineyards, of which  white and  red Puligny-Montrachet Premier Cru. The annual production of Premier Cru wine, as a five-year average, is 4,597 hectoliters of white wine and 63 hectoliters of red wine.

The climats classified as Premiers Crus are:

 Sous le Puits (Blagny)
 La Garenne (Blagny)
 Hameau de Blagny (Blagny)
 La Truffière
 Champ Gain
 Les Chalumeaux
 Champ Canet
 Clos de la Garenne
 Les Folatières
 Peux Bois
 Le Cailleret
 Au Chaniot
 Les Pucelles
 Clos Des Meix
 Clavoillon
 Les Perrières
 Clos de la Mouchère
 Les Combettes
 Les Referts

Three climats in the north of the commune, close to the border of Meursault are also entitled to the Blagny AOC, which is used for red wine.

References

Burgundy (historical region) AOCs
Côte-d'Or